Ardagh GAA is a Gaelic Athletic Association club located in County Mayo. The club plays Gaelic football and is a member of the North division of Mayo GAA.

History
The first record of Ardagh fielding a GAA team was in 1908 when they played Knockmore in a challenge game. Although there was a keen interest in football in the area, there was no official team in Ardagh until 1929. As it was the custom then for the better players to play with the great Stephenites club in Ballina. That team recorded some notable wins during the years 1929-’32. That team disbanded in 1932 when a lorry in which the team were returning from a playing a match in Skreen crashed and many of the players were injured and never played again.

Another team was affiliated in 1944 but due to immigration, was disbanded in 1946. In the late 1950s and 1960s Ardagh teams won many local 7-a-side tournaments and some of the players played for Ballina and Crossmolina. In 1972 a new club was formed named Ardmoy, representing Ardagh and Moygownagh parishes.

References